Remun, or Milikin, is an Ibanic Dayak language of Borneo.

Geographic distribution 
The language is spoken by roughly 3600 inhabitants of the Sarawak region.

Remun is the primary Iban-Remun language dialect in the Borneo area, and particularly the Sarawak region. Despite being 88% similar to the Iban language, individuals in locales that speak Remun state the language is easily hidden from outsiders' understanding, even speakers of Iban. Remun is endangered, as its speakers are slowly shifting towards speaking Iban.

Vocabulary

Sample phases in Standard Iban and Remun:
 –  "I do not see."
 –  "I could not find."

Language comparisons

References

External links

Ibanic languages
Languages of Malaysia
Agglutinative languages
Endangered Austronesian languages